Apex is the fourth studio album by Canadian heavy metal band Unleash the Archers. It was released on June 2, 2017, through Napalm Records.

Track listing

Personnel
Unleash the Archers
 Brittney Slayes – vocals
 Scott Buchanan – drums
 Grant Truesdell – guitars
 Andrew Kingsley – guitars
 Nikko Whitworth – bass

Production
 Jacob Hansen – recording, mixing, and mastering
 Jonas Haagensen – engineering assistant
 Shimon Karmel – photography
 Ken Sarafin – artwork, layout

Charts

References

2017 albums
Napalm Records albums
Unleash the Archers albums
Concept albums